The Imperial Military Constitution (also called the Reichskriegsverfassung) was the collection of military laws of the Holy Roman Empire. Like the rest of the imperial constitution, it grew out of various laws and governed the establishment of military forces within the Empire. It was the basis for the establishment of the Army of the Holy Roman Empire (Reichsarmee, created in 1422), which was under the supreme command of the Emperor but was distinct from his Imperial Army (Kaiserliche Armee, emerged in the 17th century), as it could only be deployed by the Imperial Diet. The last Imperial Defence Order (Reichsdefensionalordnung), entitled Reichsgutachten in puncto securitatis, of 13/23 May 1681, completed the military constitution of the Holy Roman Empire.

Legal development

First Imperial Register 
The first Imperial Register was drawn up at the Imperial Diet at Nuremberg in 1422. The proposal of the princes to levy a "hundredth" penny and use it to enlist and maintain an army of soldiers for the duration of a war was opposed by the cities. It was agreed to set up a single register as a list of the troop contingents of the individual imperial estates.

See also 
 Circle troops
 Circle Colonel
 Roman Month
 Army of the Holy Roman Empire

References

Sources 
 

 Der Augsburger Reichsabschied ("Augsburger Religionsfrieden") – full text

Literature 
 
 
 
 . (Ausgewählte Quellen zur deutschen Geschichte der Neuzeit. Vol. 13)
 
 
  (Inaugural-Dissertation der juristischen Fakultät der Friedrich-Alexander-Universität zu Erlangen, 1911)
 

Military history of Germany
Military history of the Holy Roman Empire
Army of the Holy Roman Empire